Stomp! is a 1978 board wargame, written by Tadashi Ehara, illustrated by Eric Vogt, William Church, and Drashi Khendup, and published by Chaosium.

Gameplay
Stomp! is a game that simulates the battle between a vapid giant named Thunderpumper and eighteen melon-munching elves who have invaded the garden of Thunderpumper's employer.

Reception
Phil Kosnett reviewed Stomp! in The Space Gamer No. 21. Kosnett commented that "I rather like this game. It's imaginative; it's fast and fun and balanced. The rules are a bit sketchy for a recruit customer to get everything right without being confused, but gamers with any experience at all will have no problem."

Reviews
Fantastic Science Fiction v27 n11

References

External links

Board games introduced in 1978
Chaosium games